Totò and Carolina is a 1955 Italian comedy film directed by Mario Monicelli and starring Totò. The film was banned when it was first released, as it made fun of a policeman.

Plot
During a police raid at Villa Borghese, the agent Antonio Caccavallo, a widower with dependent child and parent, stops along with other women of life even Carolina. In fact, the girl is just ran away from home because she was pregnant. The poor Caccavallo so by the Commissioner is obliged to give back to the country of origin, and give it to a relative. But the task of arranging Carolina will prove to be more complicated than expected, partly because of the reluctance of the girl who does not want to set foot where she had fled. Nevertheless, Carolina somehow manages to confide in and bond with the policeman, which includes professional obligations, and despite a few troubles do not go (try to escape, and even suicide) does not grudge. In the end, lying to his superiors about the success of the mission, it will load Caccavallo welcoming her to his house, where for a long time lacked a female presence.

In the final scene, after Caccavallo told the Commissioner: "You will find a fool who gets angry", follows the demand Carolina who was waiting in the street, who asked, "Where are we going?". Caccavallo replied: "A house of a fool", which contains a part of his being compassionate and its lack of affection, and other bankruptcy as guardian of legality.

Cast
 Totò as Antonio Caccavallo
 Anna Maria Ferrero as Carolina De Vico
 Arnoldo Foà as Commissary
 Maurizio Arena as Mario, the thief
 Tina Pica as Lady at hospital
 Gianni Cavalieri as Man from Venice
 Rosita Pisano as Mrs. Barozzoli
 Fanny Landini as Prostitute
 Nino Vingelli as Brigadiere
 Enzo Garinei as Dott. Rinaldi
 Guido Agostinelli as Caccavallo's father
 Giovanni Grasso as Deputy Commissary

References

External links

1955 films
1955 comedy films
Italian comedy films
1950s Italian-language films
Films directed by Mario Monicelli
Films set in Rome
Films with screenplays by Age & Scarpelli
Italian black-and-white films
1950s Italian films